André Ménard (14 February 1907 in Blois, France  – 4 November 1988 in Paris, France) was a Governor General in the French colonial empire in the 20th century.

Significant events
During his reign, the coup d'État de Yanaon happened on 13 June 1954. In the aftermath, he recalled the Administrator of Yanam (Administrateur de Yanaon), George Sala, to Pondicherry.

Titles

References

 Book of the French Military

French generals
French colonial governors and administrators
Governors of French India
1907 births
1988 deaths
Resident Commissioners of the New Hebrides (France)